Aşk Yeniden is a Turkish romantic comedy television series produced by Süreç Film starring Özge Özpirinçci and Buğra Gülsoy. It premiered on Fox on February 10, 2015 to June 14, 2016.

Plot 

Zeynep is a headstrong and bold girl living in Istanbul with her Fisherman father Şevket, who loves his daughter unconditionally. Zeynep falls in love with a guy named Ertan, and later leaves her home to elope with him to America. In America, they live quite happily until Zeynep discovers of being pregnant, but Ertan asks her to abort the baby. Ertan leaves Zeynep after she refuses to do so. Zeynep breaks down and gives birth to a baby boy, Selim. But, she comes back to Turkey after 10 months as she unable to living with a baby and surviving in a foreign land.

On the other hand, Fatih Şekercizade, who belongs to a well-established and elite family of Turkey. He had been facing the pressure of being from an elite family from his mother who happens to be making his decisions from his childhood and has betrothed him to the girl of her own choice. In order to have a peaceful and free life Fatih had escaped to America with the excuse of studying. In America, he falls in love with Summer who then denies his proposal at the end. Heartbroken Fatih decides to return to Turkey. While in the flight, due to a turbulence Fatih and Zeynep ran into one another. Fatih who doesn't want to marry İrem, offers Zeynep to pretend to be his wife and Selim to be his son in front of his family so that he would be able to settle his issue for sometime. On the other hand, Zeynep who was also worried about telling her father about her baby and Ertan agrees it as Fatih agrees to pretend as Selim's father.

After arriving İstanbul, they visit fatih's family first where Fatih introduces Zeynep to his family. His family members consists of his parents Mukaddes and Fehmi, his younger sister Selin and his grandmother Gülsüm Şekercizade. Fatih's family accepts Zeynep and her son after a short while, except for Fatih' mother, Mukaddes who hates Zeynep and Selim more than anything else and plans to kick her out of Fatih's life at any cost. On the other hand, Zeynep also introduces Fatih to her family, Her family is a middle-class family consisting of her Father Şevket, her aunt Yadigar and her cousins, Orhan and Elif su. At first the family members seem to be hesitant however later accept Fatih. However, Şevket who seemed to be upset with Zeynep as she had left him, takes his anger out on Fatih by ordering his nephew Orhan to abduct Selin. Orhan who happens to obey every order from his uncle, abducts Selin and both get married against Selin's will. However this creates a rift between both families for a while but then the issues get settled and the families eventually start to accept each other.

Gradually Zeynep and Fatih start to understand one another more every day after Zeynep confesses her past with Ertan to Fatih. Orhan and Selin fall in love with each another. However, Fatih's bestfriend Mete and Zeynep's best friend Fadik support them in every manner. As the story moves on, Fatih develops a loving relationship with Selim and starts to consider him as his own son and falls in love with Zeynep. They stay happy until Zeynep's long lost mother Meryem (whom Zeynep thinks as dead) returns from Europe as a business tycoon. Upon learning this, Şevket tries to keep her away from Meryem as he misunderstood that Meryem left them for another man. Meryem tries to purchase the business of Fatih's family, but gives up when she discovers that Fatih is Zeynep's husband and that Zeynep is her daughter. Meryem then tries to reconcile with Zeynep by befriending her first as an employer and Şevket informs Meryem's truth to Fatih, who helps him to keep Meryem away from Zeynep for keep her happy. Soon, Meryem informs Şevket how she always loved her family and how she was threatened to leave her family and had to leave with a man. This reunites Şevket and Meryem and Şevket reveals Meryem's truth to Zeynep who gets shocked and stays away from her "lying" parents for a while. Soon, she leaves Fatih after she finds that Fatih also being involved with this. However Fatih tries to explain himself in every way but she discourages him. Upon realizing her mistake, Zeynep apologizes from him. Later Fatih proposes Zeynep and decide to genuinely marry in secret. However, Zeynep feels quite guilty upon hiding the reality from their loved ones and families and convinces Fatih to tell the truth to the families. Both of them bring the truth to their families. After that, Fatih's family disowns Zeynep and Selim leading to Fatih disowning his family, surname and legacy for Zeynep and Selim. On the other side, Şevket encourages his daughter of being strong by giving birth to Selim and Fatih as being a true human. Fatih and Zeynap then move in to Zeynep's family.

Since the family was a middle-class family with so many people living under the same roof including the neighbors Ayfer and her daughters Fadik and Saziment. Fatih had to compromise his lifestyle and find a job to meet the needs of Zeynep and Selim. Moreover upon realizing her family's selfish behavior towards Fatih and Zeynep, Selin also decides to leave the home and moves in with Zeynep's family. The home becomes a livelihood of so many people living together and proves to be a heaven for Fatih and Selin in a short time. With time, Zeynep also develops a healthy relationship with her parents. Meryem also leaves her Villa and moves in with the family. Time passes, and the family stays happy, until Vahit enters their life. Vahit ego believes that Meryem had poisoned his brother in order to get his business, abducts Zeynep and poisons her. Upon being discovered, Zeynep is found poisoned and was rushed to hospital from where everyone try to find the antidote as soon. However they cannot convince Vahit for the antidote until Ertan shows up with antidote. Zeynep is saved, and Şevket thanks him greatly. Ertan tries to gain Zeynep again without himself knowing the fact that he is Selim's real father. however, Fatih's family realize their mistake and brace Zeynap and Selim as their own. Zeynep and Fatih get marry on the same day with Orhan and Selin. But, Mukaddes, who somehow finds Ertan's truth, blackmails Zeynep to leave Fatih otherwise she reveals about Ertan. Then, Zeynep and Fatih come to a plan.

The plans involves Fatih and Zeynap pretending to quarrel and then getting divorced this time in front of even their best friends and family members so that this would prevent Mukaddes from creating troubles for sometime. The couple then fights in front of everybody and divorces one another. Upon learning about the divorce and Zeynep leaving the Şekercizade villa, Mukaddes becomes so happy that almost forgets Ertan while on the other hand, both of the family members fall into a grief. While both the families are grieving, Mukaddes asks Fatih to remarry somebody with her choice this time, Fatih in order to escape lies of having a secret lover and that he had actually cheated Zeynep, thus adding more happiness for Mukaddes. Now the couple, decides to find somebody to pretend to be Fatih's lover and thus reaches Şaziment. Though Şaziment had been the part of Zeynep's family but since she had never left her room in years therefore nobody in Fatih's family had seen her before, also Şaziment had proven to be trustworthy for Zeynep and Fatih, who then try to convince her to work with them by first letting her know their secret. Şaziment finally agrees by being an American-Turkish girl Melissa who had come from New York to marry Fatih.

Cast 
 Özge Özpirinçci as Zeynep Taşkın Şekercizade – Şevket and Meryem's daughter; Fatih's wife; Ertan's ex-fiancée; Selim and Jr. Gülsüm's mother
 Buğra Gülsoy as Fatih Şekercizade – Fehmi and Mukaddes' son; Selin's brother; Zeynep's husband; Selim's adopted father; Jr. Gülsüm's father
 Tamer Levent as Şevket Taşkın – Yadigar's brother; Meryem's husband; Zeynep's father
 Sema Keçik as Meryem Taşkın – Şevket's wife; Zeynep's mother; Şekercizades' business tycoon
 Tülin Oral as Gülsüm Şekercizade – Fehmi's mother; Fatih and Selin's grandmother
 Lale Başar as Mukaddes Şekercizade – Fehmi's wife; Fatih and Selin's mother
 Orhan Alkaya as Fehmi Șekercizade – Gülsüm's son; Mukaddes's husband; Fatih and Selin's father
 Yağiz Yiğit Sayın as Selim Şekercizade – Zeynep and Ertan's son; Fatih's adoptive son; Jr. Gülsüm's half-brother
 Nilay Deniz as Selin Şekercizade Günay – Fehmi and Mukaddes's daughter; Fatih's sister; Orhan's wife
 Can Sipahi as Orhan Günay – Yadigar's son; Elif's brother; Selin's husband
 Nazlı Tosunoğlu as Yadigar Taşkın Günay – Şevket's sister; Orhan and Elif's mother; Ayfer's neighbor
 Su Bursu Coskun as Elif Su Günay – Yadigar's daughter; Orhan's sister
 Mert Öcal as Ertan Sönmez – Zeynep's ex-fiancé; Selim's father
 Esin Gündogdu as Ayfer Servermez – Yadgar's friend and neighbor; Hayder's wife; Fadik and Șaziment's mother
 İlkem Ulugün as Fadik Servermez – Ayfer's younger daughter; Șaziment's sister; Zeynep's best friend; Mete's wife
 Miray Akovalıgil as Șaziment Servermez – Ayfer's elder daughter; Fadik's sister; Birol's wife
 Emre Erkan as Mete – Fatih's best friend; Fadik's husband
 Barış Yalçın as Birol – Șaziment's husband
 Murat Kocacık as Hayder – Ayfer's second husband
 Mazhar Alican Uğur as Mustafa – Fatih's bodyguard
 Fatma Karanfil as Hacer – Fatih and Selin's governess
 Tevfik İnceoğlu as Kamil – Şevket's bodyguard
 Mert Öner as Cevat – Şevket's bodyguard
 Didem Soyden as İrem Șencan – Fatih's childhood friend
 Tunca Aydoğan as Vahit – Şevket and Meryem's enemy
 Yakup Yavru as Ethem – Şevket's friend
 Didem Soydan as İrem Şencan – Fatih's childhood friend

International broadcasts

References

External links 
  

2015 Turkish television series debuts
Turkish drama television series
Turkish romantic comedy television series
Fox (Turkish TV channel) original programming